Barnsley Football Club is a professional football club based in Barnsley, South Yorkshire, England, which compete in . Nicknamed "the Tykes", they were founded in 1887 by Reverend Tiverton Preedy and moved into Oakwell stadium the following year. The club's colours were originally blue, but were changed to just red in 1904 This is why Barnsley are famous for their red colours. The club's main rivals/derby's are fellow Yorkshire clubs Sheffield Wednesday, Sheffield United and Leeds United, with Huddersfield Town and Rotherham United considered as rivals.

Barnsley spent the 1890s in the Sheffield & District, Midland and Yorkshire leagues, before gaining admittance to the Football League Second Division in 1898. They twice reached the final of the FA Cup whilst still in the second tier, losing to Newcastle United in 1910 and winning the competition with victory over West Bromwich Albion in 1912. The club suffered relegation in 1932, but secured promotion as Third Division North champions in 1933–34. They won the Third Division North title for a second time in 1938–39, having been relegated the previous season. Relegated again in 1953, they secured another Third Division North title in 1954–55. However, further relegations left them in the fourth tier of English football by 1966. Promotion from the Fourth Division was achieved in 1967–68, though they were relegated after just four seasons. The club secured two promotions in three years under the stewardship of Allan Clarke and then Norman Hunter, and from 1981 would spend sixteen consecutive years in the second tier.

Premier League football was secured for the 1997–98 season with a second place finish in the First Division, though they relegated after one season and dropped down to the third tier in 2002. Barnsley won the 2006 League One play-off final and remained in the Championship for eight seasons. Relegated in 2014, they won both the 2016 Football League Trophy final and the 2016 League One play-off final, though this time spent just two seasons in the Championship. In 2017, a majority stake in the club was sold to a consortium that included Chien Lee, Neerav Parekh and Billy Beane. Barnsley won promotion out of League One with a second-place finish in 2018–19, before being relegated out of the Championship again in 2022. Barnsley have spent more seasons and played more games at the second level of English football than any other team.

History

Beginnings and FA Cup glory 
Barnsley were established in 1887 as "Barnsley St Peter's" by a clergyman, Tiverton Preedy, and played in the Sheffield and District League from 1890 and then in the Midland League from 1895. In 1897, the club dropped "St Peter's" from its name to become simply Barnsley. They joined the Football League in 1898, and struggled in the Second Division for the first decade, due in part to ongoing financial difficulties. In 1910, the club reached the FA Cup final, where they lost out to Newcastle United in a replay match. In 1912, they reached the FA Cup final again, and defeated West Bromwich Albion 1–0 after a replay to win the trophy for the first time in their history. When league football restarted after the First World War, the 1919–20 season brought some significant changes to the league. The principal difference was that the First Division would be increased from 20 teams to 22. The bottom team from the previous season was Tottenham Hotspur and they were relegated. The first extra place in the First Division went to Chelsea, who retained their place despite finishing second bottom and therefore in the relegation places. Derby County and Preston North End were promoted from the Second Division which left one place to be filled.

Having finished the previous season's Second Division in third place (1914–15), Barnsley expected to achieve First Division status for the first time, but the Football League instead chose to call a ballot of the clubs. The League voted to promote sixth-placed Arsenal, for reasons of history over merit;  Sir Henry Norris, the then Arsenal chairman, argued that Arsenal be promoted for their "long service to league football", having been the first League club from the South. It has been alleged that this was due to backroom deals or even outright bribery by Sir Henry Norris, colluding with his friend John McKenna, the chairman of Liverpool and the Football League, who recommended Arsenal's promotion at the AGM. No conclusive proof of wrongdoing has come to light, though other aspects of Norris's financial dealings unrelated to the promotion controversy have fuelled speculation on the matter; Norris resigned as chairman and left the club in 1929, having been found guilty by the Football Association of financial irregularities; he was found to have misused his expenses account, and to have pocketed the proceeds of the sale of the Arsenal team bus.

Pre-war and post-war era 
The club did however come close to reaching the top division in the early years. In 1921–22, they missed out on promotion by goal difference. During the years preceding and following the Second World War, the club found themselves sliding between the Second and Third Division. In 1949, the club signed Danny Blanchflower from Glentoran, and he impressed at Oakwell that two years later he was signed by First Division side Aston Villa, later signing for Tottenham Hotspur and being voted FWA Player of the Year twice, as well as being the captain of the 20th century's first league and cup double winning team in 1960–61.  Around the time of Blanchflower's departure, a young centre-forward called Tommy Taylor broke into the Barnsley team, scoring 26 goals in 44 games for Barnsley. In April 1953, he became one of the most expensive players in English football at the time when Matt Busby signed him for Manchester United for a fee of £29,999. Taylor went on to be a prolific goalscorer at the highest level over the next five years, winning two league titles and also scoring 16 times in 19 appearances for the England national football team, before losing his life in the Munich air disaster in February 1958.

When the Northern and Southern sections of the Third Division were replaced by national Third and Fourth Divisions for the 1958–59 season, Barnsley were still in the Second Division, but went down to the Third Division at the end of that season. In 1965, Barnsley were relegated to the Football League Fourth Division for the first time, winning promotion three years later. They went down to the Fourth Division again in 1972, and this time stayed down for seven seasons, finally returning to the Third Division in 1979. Two years later, they went up again and quickly established themselves as a decent Second Division side throughout the 1980s, although they still failed to clinch that elusive First Division place, despite the introduction of the play-offs in the second half of the decade, which gave teams finishing as low as fifth and eventually sixth the chance of winning promotion.

Division One and the Premier League 

For the 1994–95 season, Barnsley turned to midfielder Danny Wilson to manage the club. His first season brought a sixth-place finish in the First Division, which would normally have meant a play-off place, but a restructuring of the league meant that they missed out. They finished 10th a year later before finally emerging as serious promotion contenders in the 1996–97 season, finally clinching runners-up spot and automatic promotion and gaining the top flight place that they had spent 99 years trying to win. Barnsley lasted just one season in the Premier League but they did reach the quarter-finals of the FA Cup, defeating Manchester United in the fifth round. They also made their record signing that season with Gjorgji Hristov for £2 million. Wilson then departed to take over at Sheffield Wednesday, being succeeded as Barnsley manager by striker John Hendrie, who had been a key player in the promotion-winning team. Barnsley were the only team from outside the Premier League to reach the quarter-finals of the FA Cup in the 1998–99 season, but only finished 13th in the league. Hendrie was then replaced as manager by Dave Bassett, who rejuvenated the team and took them to fourth place in 1999–2000. The team lost in the play-off final to Ipswich Town, the last play-off final at Wembley before the stadium was closed for redevelopment.

Mixed fortunes in the 21st century 
The team were relegated to the Second Division in 2002; administration threatened the existence of the club as Barnsley suffered greatly due to the ITV Digital crisis. A late purchase by Barnsley's then mayor, Peter Doyle, saved the club from folding. In 2006, the side won in the play-off final at the Millennium Stadium in Cardiff, where they beat Swansea City 4–3 on penalties to earn promotion to the Championship. The manager at this time was Andy Ritchie, who was in his first season in charge after replacing Paul Hart. The team struggled in their first season back in the Championship. In November 2006, with Barnsley in the relegation zone, Ritchie was sacked in favour of Simon Davey, who managed to steer the team away from relegation in the second half of the season, and they eventually finished 20th. The following season, Barnsley reached the semi-final of the FA Cup, beating Premier League side Liverpool 2–1 at Anfield and defending champions Chelsea 1–0; the team lost 1–0 against fellow Championship side Cardiff City at Wembley in the semi-final. In October 2008, the club fielded the youngest player in the Football League's history when Reuben Noble-Lazarus came on against Ipswich Town aged 15 years and 45 days.

Barnsley ended the 2011–12 season as one of only two football clubs to turn a profit in the Championship; they stayed up only because Portsmouth were given a 10-point deduction for going into administration. In 2016, Barnsley won the Football League Trophy after a 3–2 win against Oxford United. They gained promotion to the Championship following a 3–1 win over Millwall in the play-off final later that season. In September 2016, Barnsley were caught up in an ongoing scandal in English football, with assistant manager Tommy Wright alleged to have accepted "bungs" in exchange for working as an ambassador for a third-party player ownership consortium. Wright was initially suspended before being sacked by Barnsley.

New ownership
In December 2017, Patrick Cryne and his family sold an 80% stake in the club to NewCity Capital's Chien Lee and Pacific Media Group's Paul Conway; they were joined by Indian investor Neerav Parekh and executive vice president of baseball operations and minority owner of the Oakland Athletics of Major League Baseball, Billy Beane (famous from the Moneyball film), as part of the international investor consortium. Barnsley were relegated to the third tier in 2017–18; afterwards. the new owners used a data approach to identify talents, focusing on young players and team rebuilding. The club appointed Daniel Stendel as head coach, who played high pressing football; Barnsley were promoted back to the Championship the following season. In the 2019–20 season, under new coach Gerhard Struber, Barnsley avoided relegation from the Championship. In 2020–21, under the management of Valérien Ismaël, Barnsley finished in fifth place and made it to the EFL Championship Play-offs for the first time in 24 years, with the youngest squad and one of the smallest budgets in the league. The Wall Street Journal called Barnsley a "Moneyball experiment".

Prior to the 2021–22 season, Markus Schopp was revealed as the new head coach. In November 2021, Schopp was sacked after a run of seven straight defeats. Three weeks later Poya Asbaghi was appointed as the new head coach. Fortunes improved little as Barnsley were relegated from the 2021–22 EFL Championship following a 2–1 defeat against Huddersfield Town. Asbaghi left the club by mutual consent shortly afterwards. On 15 June 2022, Michael Duff was appointed head coach of Barnsley FC on a three-year deal.

In May 2022, it was revealed that Pacific Media Group did not actually own all the shares they claimed to own, and were simply a nominee for a group of 4 investors who owned 20% of the club. Following this revelation, Neerav Parekh purchased the shares of 2 of the investors, while Matt Edmonds purchased the shares of the 4th investor. As a result, the new ownership of the club is now understood to be split between Neerav Parekh (35.25%), Chien Lee (31.25%), Julie Anne Quay and Matt Edmonds (6%), the Cryne family (20%) and Conway’s company Pacific Media Group (7.5%). With this reconstituted shareholding and a loss of majority control, Paul Conway, Chien Lee, Grace Hung and Dickson Lee were voted off the board of Barnsley Football Club, and were replaced by Jean Cryne and Julie Anne Quay.

Stadium 

The stadium's name, Oakwell, originates from the well and oak tree that were on the site when first built. Oakwell is a multi-purpose sports development in Barnsley, South Yorkshire, used primarily by the club for playing its home fixtures, and its reserves. While the name 'Oakwell' generally refers to the main stadium, it also includes several neighbouring venues which form the facilities of the Barnsley academy – an indoor training pitch, a smaller stadium with seating on the south and west sides for around 2,200 spectators, and several training pitches used by the different Barnsley squads. Until 2003, the stadium and the vast amount of land that surrounds it was owned by Barnsley themselves; however, after falling into administration in 2002 the council purchased the main Oakwell Stadium to allow the club to pay its creditors and remain participants in the Football League.

Rivalries 
According to a survey, 'The League of Love and Hate' conducted in August 2019, Barnsley supporters named fellow Yorkshire clubs Sheffield Wednesday, Sheffield United and Leeds United as their biggest rivals, with Huddersfield Town and Rotherham United following.

Colours and strip

Kit manufacturers and shirt sponsors

Strip

Home strip 

Barnsley have played their home games in red shirts for most of their history. The only exception to this is the period 1887–1901, where it is speculated that the team first wore blue shirts with claret arms, then circa 1890 the team wore chocolate and white stripes, before moving on to blue and white stripes around 1898. The team first wore red shirts in 1901. Since this time, the team have worn red shirts often with a white trim, although in more recent times a black trim has sometimes been used. As with most football clubs the shirt design varies from season to season. One particular design that stands out is the 1989–90 season shirt which featured white stars on a red background and has been named as one of the worst shirts ever. Manufacturers logos were added to the shirt in 1976–77, while sponsors were first added in the 1980–81 season.

Away strip 

The club's away strip (used for away or cup fixtures where there is a clash of colours) differs from season to season but usually follows the design of the season's home strip with a variation on the colours. The most common colour for the away shirt has been white but many others have been used, including blue, yellow, black, ecru, dark green and even black and blue stripes. One notable away strip was the 2001–02 "Its just like watching Brazil" kit, where the team wore the colours of the five-time World Cup winners Brazil for their away games.

Players

Current squad

Out on loan

Under-21s

Under-18s

Staff

Ownership structure 
 Neerav Parekh 35.25%
 Chien Lee 31.25%
 Pacific Media Group 7.5%
 Cryne family 20.0%
 Julie Anne Quay and Matt Edmonds 6.0%

Board 
 Owner(s):
 Director: Jean Cryne 
 Director: Neerav Parekh
 Director: James Cryne
 Director: Julie Anne Quay
Chief Executive Officer: Khaled El-Ahmad
Finance and Operations Director: Mr Robert Zuk

First team staff

Managerial history

Club records 
 Record league victory: 9–0
 v Loughborough, Second Division, 28 January 1899
 v Accrington Stanley (away), Third Division North, 3 February 1934
 Record cup victory: 6–0 v Blackpool, FA Cup First Round, 20 January 1910
 Record league defeat: 0–9 v Notts County, Second Division, 19 January 1927
 Record cup defeat: 1–8 v Derby County, FA Cup First Round, 30 January 1897
 Most appearances: Barry Murphy, 569
 Most goals scored for the club: Ernie Hine, 131
 Most league goals scored in a season: Cecil McCormack, 33, 1950–51 Second Division
 Most international caps: Gerry Taggart, 35, Northern Ireland
 Record transfer fee received: £4,500,000 from Blackburn Rovers for Ashley Ward (1998)
 Record transfer fee paid: £1,500,000 to Partizan Belgrade for Georgi Hristov (1997) and £1,500,000 to QPR for Mike Sheron (1999)
 Record attendance: 40,255 v Stoke City, FA Cup Fifth Round, 15 February 1936
 Youngest ever Football League player: Reuben Noble-Lazarus, 15 years and 45 days
 Oldest player: Mike Pollitt, 41 years, 5 months and 30 days
 Most goals scored in a single game: 5;
 Frank Eaton v South Shields, 1927
 Peter Cunningham v Darlington, 1933
 Beaumont Asquith v Darlington, 1938
 Cecil McCormack v Luton Town, 1950
Barnsley have spent more seasons and played more games at the second level of English football than any other team.

Player of the season

Source: Barnsley F.C.

Honours 

Source:

League 
Second Division/Championship
 Runners-up: 1996–97
Third Division/League One
 Champions: 1933–34, 1938–39, 1954–55
 Runners-up: 1980–81, 2018–19
 Play–off winners: 2006, 2016
Fourth Division/League Two
 2nd place promotion: 1967–68
 4th place promotion: 1978–79

Cup 
FA Cup
 Winners: 1911–12
 Runners-up: 1909–10
Football League Trophy
Winners: 2015–16

Notes

References

External links 

 
 Barnsley at ScoreShelf
 Barnsley FC at the Barnsley Chronicle
 Barnsley FC Supporters Trust
 BBC South Yorkshire's Barnsley FC Page
 Barnsley Statistics at Football365
 Independent Barnsley FC News – barnsleyfc.com
 Barnsley FC News at NewsNow

 
Football clubs in England
Football clubs in South Yorkshire
Association football clubs established in 1887
1887 establishments in England
Sport in Barnsley
FA Cup winners
Sheffield & District Football League
Midland Football League (1889)
Yorkshire Football League
English Football League clubs
Premier League clubs
Sheffield & Hallamshire County FA members
Companies that have entered administration in the United Kingdom
EFL Trophy winners